was a province of Japan in the area that is today the south and western portion of Ishikawa Prefecture in the Hokuriku region of Japan. Kaga bordered on Echizen, Etchū, Hida, and Noto Provinces. It was part of Hokurikudō Circuit.

History
 was an ancient province of Japan and is listed as one of the original provinces in the Nihon Shoki. In 701 AD, per the reforms of the Taihō Code, Koshi was divided into three separate provinces: Echizen, Etchū, and Echigo.

In 823 AD, the two eastern districts of Echizen Province (Kaga and Enuma) were separated to form Kaga Province. Kaga was thus the last province to be created under the ritsuryō system. The same year, the northern portion of Enuma District became Nomi District, and the southern portion on Kaga District became Ishikawa District. Kaga District itself was renamed Kahoku District.

The provincial capital and provincial temple were located in what is now the city of Komatsu; however, there does not appear to have been a provincial nunnery. The Ichinomiya of the province is the Shirayama Hime Shrine in what is now the city of Hakusan. Under the Engishiki classification system, Kaga was ranked as a "superior country" (上国) in terms of importance and "middle country" (中国) in terms of distance from the capital. Despite this classification, Kaga never developed a powerful local gōzoku clan but was divided into many shōen estates.

During the early Sengoku period, the province was largely under the control of the Ikkō-ikki, who established a loosely governed confederation in the province. The area was eventually conquered by Oda Nobunaga's general Shibata Katsuie and subsequently came under the control of Maeda Toshiie under the rule of Toyotomi Hideyoshi. The Maeda clan retained control of the province as part of Kaga Domain during the Edo period Tokugawa shogunate. From 1639, Enuma Domain and a portion of Nomi Domain were separated from Kaga Domain into the 100,000 koku Daishōji Domain, which was ruled by a junior branch of the Maeda clan.

Following the Meiji Restoration and the abolition of the han system in 1871, Kaga Province was divided into Kanazawa Prefecture and Daishōji Prefecture, which were merged with Fukui Prefecture. However, only a few months later in 1872, Kanazawa and Daishōji were divided back out and merged with Nanao Prefecture (the former Noto Province) to form today's Ishikawa Prefecture. In 1876, former Etchū Province was united with Ishikawa, only to become separated again in 1883.

Historical districts
 Ishikawa Prefecture
 Enuma District (江沼郡) – dissolved
 Ishikawa District (石川郡) – dissolved
 Kahoku District (河北郡)
 Nomi District (能美郡)

Bakumatsu period domains

See also
 Japanese aircraft carrier Kaga

Notes

References
 Nussbaum, Louis-Frédéric and Käthe Roth. (2005). Japan encyclopedia. Cambridge: Harvard University Press. ; OCLC 58053128
 Papinot, Edmond. (1910). Historical and Geographic Dictionary of Japan. Tokyo: Librarie Sansaisha. OCLC 77691250

External links 

 Murdoch's map of provinces, 1903

 
Former provinces of Japan
History of Ishikawa Prefecture
Hokuriku region
1871 disestablishments in Japan
States and territories disestablished in 1871